Tabarak may refer to:
 Tabarak-e Olya
 Tabarak-e Sofla